Peter Francke (1897-1978) was a German screenwriter. He wrote the screenplay for The Girl from Barnhelm (1940), an adaptation of a play by Gotthold Ephraim Lessing.

Selected filmography
 Happy Days in Aranjuez (1933)
 The Voice of Love (1934)
 Holiday From Myself (1934)
 The Saint and Her Fool (1935)
 Miracle of Flight (1935)
 The Monastery's Hunter (1935)
 City of Anatol (1936)
 Wells in Flames (1937)
 Comrades at Sea (1938)
 Water for Canitoga (1939)
 The Governor (1939)
 A Woman Like You (1939)
 The Girl from Barnhelm (1940)
 What Does Brigitte Want? (1941)
 Beloved World (1942)
 I Need You (1944)
 A Man Like Maximilian (1945)
 Maresi (1948)
 The Disturbed Wedding Night (1950)
 Regimental Music (1950)
 Toxi (1952)
 Carnival in White (1952)
 Holiday From Myself (1952)
 Stars Over Colombo (1953)
 The Country Schoolmaster (1954)
 Spring Song (1954)
 In Hamburg When the Nights Are Long (1956)

References

Bibliography 
 Fischer, Barbara & Fox, Thomas C. A Companion to the Works of Gotthold Ephraim Lessing. Camden House, 2005. 
 Klossner, Michael. The Europe of 1500-1815 on Film and Television. McFarland & Co, 2002.

External links 
 

1897 births
1978 deaths
German male screenwriters
Film people from Berlin
German male writers
20th-century German screenwriters